D. Catarina Micaela de Sousa César e Lencastre (29 September 1749 — 4 January 1824) was a Portuguese noblewoman, and a poet and playwright. While a celebrated author during her lifetime, most of her work remains unpublished.

Biography
D. Catarina was born in Guimarães on 29 September 1749 — the Feast of Saint Michael, the reason why her second given name was Micaela — the daughter of Francisco Filipe de Sousa da Silva Alcoforado (fidalgo of the Royal Household, Lord of Vila Pouca, Familiar of the Holy Office), and his wife, D. Rosa Maria Viterbo de Lencastre (daughter of the 3rd Viscounts of Asseca).

She was married by proxy on 31 August 1767 to Luís Pinto de Sousa Coutinho, at the time the Captain-General and Governor of Mato Grosso, in Brazil. When her husband was named envoy to Great Britain in 1774, she accompanied him to London where, soon enough, she hosted people notable in arts, letters, and sciences, turning the Portuguese embassy into a salon littéraire.

After definitely returning to Portugal, she became closely acquainted with the Marquise of Alorna. She became known as Safo Portuguesa ("the Portuguese Sappho") due to her poems in celebration of love.

References

1749 births
1824 deaths
18th-century Portuguese people
18th-century Portuguese poets
18th-century Portuguese women writers
18th-century Portuguese writers
19th-century Portuguese people
19th-century Portuguese poets
19th-century Portuguese women writers
People from Guimarães
Portuguese nobility
Portuguese salon-holders
Portuguese women poets